Eni Fa'aua'a Hunkin Faleomavaega Jr. (August 15, 1943 – February 22, 2017) was an American Samoan politician and attorney who served as the territory's third lieutenant governor, from 1985 to 1989 and non-voting delegate to the United States House of Representatives, from 1989 to 2015. As a delegate, Faleomavaega served on committees and spoke on the House floor; however, he was not permitted to vote on the final passage of any legislation. He also was the father-in-law of former professional American football fullback Fui Vakapuna.

Early life, education, and military service
Faleomavaega was born in Vailoatai, American Samoa and grew up in Oahu, Hawaii. He graduated from Kahuku High School and initially attended Church College of Hawaii (now Brigham Young University–Hawaii), where he completed his associate's degree. He then transferred to Brigham Young University's main campus in Utah and earned a B.A. in political science and history in 1966. He received his J.D. from the University of Houston Law Center in 1972 and LL.M. from the UC Berkeley School of Law in 1973.

He served as an enlistee in the United States Army from 1966 to 1969, and as an officer in the United States Army Reserve from 1982 to 1989. He completed a tour in the Vietnam War and left the military with the rank of captain following his second term of service. He and his wife were active members of the Church of Jesus Christ of Latter-day Saints.

Legal career
Faleomavaega served as the administrative assistant to American Samoa Delegate A.U. Fuimaono from 1973 to 1975 and as staff counsel for the House Committee on Interior and Insular Affairs from 1975 to 1981. He served as the Deputy Attorney General of American Samoa from 1981 to 1984.

Political career
Faleomavaega entered elective politics when he ran alongside A. P. Lutali in the 1985 gubernatorial race. He served as Lieutenant Governor of American Samoa from 1985 to 1989. In 1987, he participated in an event that followed traditional Polynesian life experiences by sailing from Tahiti to Hawaii in a canoe.

Congressional delegate

Faleomavaega was elected as a Democrat to the House of Representatives in 1988, serving from January 3, 1989 until January 2015. As a delegate, he has worked to receive more federal funding for his home territory, particularly for health care and other essential services. He has opposed free trade deals involving meats and seafood, as nearly one-third of his territory's population is involved in the tuna industry. He proposed legislation that would allow residents of US territories to vote in presidential elections if they are active duty members of the military. Faleomavaega also participated in a boycott of Jacques Chirac, who made a speech to a joint session of the U.S. Congress in 1996, due to French nuclear testing in the Pacific.

Committee assignments
Faleomavaega was a member of the following committees in the House of Representatives:
Committee on Foreign Affairs
Subcommittee on Asia, the Pacific, and the Global Environment (Ranking Member)
Subcommittee on the Western Hemisphere
Committee on Natural Resources
Subcommittee on Energy and Mineral Resources
Subcommittee on Fisheries, Wildlife, Oceans and Insular Affairs

Caucuses
Congressional Asian Pacific American Caucus

Support for Sri Lanka's war against the Liberation Tigers of Tamil Eelam
Faleomavaega has said that it is more opportune if the United States could refrain from interfering in internal affairs of Sri Lanka. He took the initiative of briefing members of the Sub Committee on Asia and the Pacific of the US House of Representatives in this respect.

Support for American Samoa's independence
In 2012, both Faleomavaega and Togiola Tulafono, American Samoa's Governor, called for the populace to consider a move towards autonomy if not independence, to a mixed response.

Support for Bahrain's monarchy
Faleomavaega was known for his vocal support of Bahrain's monarchy during the Bahraini uprising. One of Faleomavaega's top campaign donors, William Nixon, is a Washington, D.C.-based lobbyist whose firm, Policy Impact Communications, founded the pro-monarchy Bahrain American Council. He has taken various paid trips to Bahrain to meet with that country's rulers.

Legacy

VA Clinic 
On March 31, 2017, President Donald Trump signed H.R. 1362 into law. H.R. 1362 names the VA clinic in Pago Pago, American Samoa, the "Faleomavaega Eni Fa'aua'a Hunkin VA Clinic." The bill was sponsored by Delegate Amata Coleman Radewagen, Faleomavaega's successor as representative from American Samoa, and co-sponsored by five others.

Death
Faleomavaega suffered from complications that he said are from his exposure to Agent Orange during the Vietnam War. Voters' concerns about his health are speculated to have contributed to his 2014 election defeat.

Faleomavaega died at the age of 73 on Wednesday, February 22, 2017. The cause was not specified. He was survived by his wife, 5 children, and 10 grandchildren.

See also
 List of Delegates to the United States House of Representatives from American Samoa
 List of Asian Americans and Pacific Islands Americans in the United States Congress

References

External links
 
House Democrats Profile

|-

1943 births
2017 deaths
20th-century American politicians
21st-century American politicians
American Samoa Democrats
American Samoan Latter Day Saints
Brigham Young University alumni
Brigham Young University–Hawaii alumni
Delegates to the United States House of Representatives from American Samoa
Democratic Party members of the United States House of Representatives from American Samoa
Lieutenant Governors of American Samoa
People from Western District, American Samoa
United States Army officers
UC Berkeley School of Law alumni
University of Houston Law Center alumni
United States Army reservists